Richard Edward George May (16 May 1910 – 13 September 1986) was an Australian rules footballer who played with North Melbourne in the Victorian Football League (VFL).

May enlisted in the Australian Army shortly after the commencement of World War II and served until the end of the war, with his battalion serving in both the Middle East and northern Australia during his service.

Notes

External links 

1910 births
1986 deaths
Australian rules footballers from Victoria (Australia)
North Melbourne Football Club players
Australian Army personnel of World War II
Australian Army soldiers